Hawalli may refer to:
Hawalli Governorate, a governorate in Kuwait
Hawalli, Kuwait, the capital of Hawalli Governorate
Hawalli, India